The James Adams Floating Theatre was a floating theater founded in 1914 by James Adams and his wife Gertrude, that toured Chesapeake Bay staging theater in Maryland, Virginia, and North Carolina. It was visited in 1925 by Edna Ferber, who boarded the vessel in Bath, North Carolina, while writing the 1926 novel which inspired Jerome Kern and Oscar Hammerstein II’s Broadway show Show Boat.  After the James and Beulah retired in 1917, the management of the theater was turned over to Charles Hunter and his wife Beulah Adams Hunter (sister of James Adams).

In early decades of the 20th century, the showboat, a huge, scow-like wooden craft plying the Chesapeake Bay, called at waterfront towns from the top of the Chesapeake down to the coast of North Carolina. It occasionally ventured as far south as South Carolina and Georgia, but spent most of its time in Virginia, Maryland and North Carolina. The arrival of the Adams Floating Theater was an exciting time for residents in these isolated communities as the performances got underway. The theater generally stayed six nights in one venue, performing a different set of plays and entertainment each night to help insure returning audiences. Travel to the next venue took place on the seventh day. Then as summer gave way to fall, the floating theater drifted south toward Elizabeth City, NC, where it normally spent the winter  Over 200 different plays were performed in the years the  James Adams Floating Theater was active (1914-1941).

By the 1930s the business was falling off, though the shows continued through much of the decade.  In 1941 the theater was destroyed by fire while being towed to Savannah, Georgia to be refitted. A group of volunteers is working to build a reproduction.

References

External links
 

Floating theatres